Edward Bevan (8 July 1770, London – 31 January 1860, Hereford) was an English physician and apiarist, known for his 1827 treatise on honey bees (and a revised, enlarged edition in 1838).

Edward Bevan attended four years of grammar school in Wotton-under-Edge (where he was appointed school captain) and then studied at the college school in Hereford. In that town he was apprenticed to a surgeon and then went to London. There he became a student at St Bartholomew's Hospital, where he attended three academic sessions of lectures given by John Abernethy, John Latham, and William Austin. Bevan obtained his higher doctorate of medicine (research degree) in 1818 from the University of St Andrews. He spent five years working as an assistant to Dr. John Clarke in Mortlake and then practised medicine on his own account at Stoke-upon-Trent and afterward at Congleton in the county of Cheshire. There he married a daughter of an apothecary and spent twelve years practising medicine. He then returned to Mortlake, where he assisted Samuel Parkes in London in the preparation of the third and revised edition of Parkes's Rudiments of Chemistry. After two years practicing in Mortlake, Bevan retired to a small rural estate at Bridstow in the county of Herefordshire. There he developed an apiary which already existed on the property he purchased.

In 1833 he was one of the founders of the Royal Entomological Society. In 1849 he moved from Bridstow to Hereford.

In 1870 William Augustus Munn, F.R.H.S., published a third edition of The Honey-Bee: its Natural History, Physiology, and Management.

References

External links
 
 

1770 births
1860 deaths
18th-century English medical doctors
19th-century English medical doctors
British beekeepers